Hants Border (2006 population: 352) is a community in the Canadian province of Nova Scotia, located in Kings County next to  West Hants municipality and Hantsport on Nova Scotia Trunk 1.

Demographics 

References

 Hants Border on Destination Nova Scotia

Communities in Kings County, Nova Scotia
Designated places in Nova Scotia